Vrtište is a village situated in Niš municipality in Serbia.

Population 
According to 2011 census, there are 1,116 people living in Vrtište. In 2002, there were 1,052 residents.

References

Populated places in Nišava District